A referendum on the electoral law was held in San Marino on 22 September 1996. Voters were asked four questions on changes to the electoral law and electoral system, all of which were approved by voters.

Results

Question I

Question II

Question III

Question IV

References

1996 referendums
Referendums in San Marino
1996 in San Marino
September 1996 events in Europe